Lowland Cottage is a historic home located near Ware Neck, Gloucester County, Virginia.  The main and earliest part of the house, considered to have been built between 1666 and 1676, is a gambrel roofed, -story structure, approximately 40 feet by 20 feet. Sometime between 1783 and 1831 Lowland Cottage received two additions: a -story gambrel-roofed wing on the east end, and a two-story wing on the north side.  The house was remodeled in 1935.

It was added to the National Register of Historic Places in 1971.

See also
List of the oldest buildings in Virginia

References

Houses on the National Register of Historic Places in Virginia
Houses completed in 1671
Houses in Gloucester County, Virginia
National Register of Historic Places in Gloucester County, Virginia
1671 establishments in Virginia